The Many Voices of Miriam Makeba is a 1962 studio album of Miriam Makeba (LP Kapp KL1274).

Track listing
All tracks composed by Miriam Makeba; except where indicated
"Kilimanjaro (Hunting Song and Boot Dance)" (Mackay Davashe, Tom Glazer) – 2:48	
"Zenizenabo (Courage Song for Warriors)" – 1:17	
"Ntjilo Ntjilo (Lullaby to a Child about a Little Canary)" – 2:23	
"Umqokozo (Children's game song About a new red dress)" – 2:05	
"Ngola Kurila (A Woman Pacifies Her Hungry Child. There Is Nothing to Eat)" – 3:13	
"Thanayi (Story song about a girl named Thanayi)" – 3:08	
"Liwa Wechi (Congolese Lament. The Wife Bids Her Husband Farewell As He Leaves For The Mines)" (Franco Luambo) – 2:49	
"Nagula (Witch Doctor Song)" – 1:36	
"Carnival (Theme from the Brazilian Movie Black Orpheus)" (Luiz Bonfá) – 2:28
"Night Must Fall (American)" (Bob Gordon, Priscilla Eaves) – 1:55
"Love Tastes Like Strawberries (West Indian Ballad)" (Alma M. Saunders, B.J. Solomon) – 3:20	
"Can't Cross Over (West Indian Calypso)" (Irving Burgie) – 3:21

Personnel
Miriam Makeba – vocals
Ernie Calabria, Jack Check – vocals
Norman Keenan – bass guitar
Hugh Masekela – trumpet
Daniel Barrajanos, Julio Collazo, Michael Alexander, Ralph MacDonald, Rod Clavery – percussion
Ralph Hunter – conductor

References

External links

1962 albums
Miriam Makeba albums